Working!! is an anime television series adapted from the four-panel comic strip manga series of the same title by Karino Takatsu. It was written and directed by Yoshimasa Hiraike and produced by A-1 Pictures. Chief animator Shingo Adachi also served as the character designer and Yōta Tsuruoka of Rakuonsha was the sound director. The story follows 16-year-old Sōta Takanashi who gets a part-time job working at the family restaurant Wagnaria. Sōta finds the people he works with have many quirks, himself included.

The first season of the anime aired between April 4 and June 26, 2010 on the Tokyo MX Japanese television network, and was later released on seven DVD compilation volumes, each containing two episodes, except for the first volume which contains one episode. The volumes were released between April 21 and October 27, 2010 by Aniplex. A Blu-ray Disc box set of the series will be released on August 24, 2011 in Japan by Aniplex. The anime is licensed for release in North America by NIS America, and an English-subtitled DVD box set was released in March 2011 under the title Wagnaria!!. A second anime season titled Working'!! aired between October 1 and December 24, 2011. A preview of the first episode aired on September 3, 2011. A third season, Working!!!, aired between July 4 and September 26, 2015 and is licensed in North America by Aniplex of America. A one-hour finale aired on December 26, 2015.

The last series takes place at another Wagnaria restaurant with a different main protagonist. High school freshman Daisuke Higashida reluctantly takes up a part-time job after his father's company goes bankrupt. Its title was WWW.Working!! and aired from October 1 to December 24, 2016.

The background music of the series was composed and arranged by Keiichi Okabe, Keiichi Hirokawa, Hidekazu Tanaka, Kuniyuki Takahashi and Keigo Hoashi of the group Monaca. Three pieces of theme music are used for the first season: one opening theme and two ending themes. The opening theme is "Someone Else" performed by Kana Asumi, Saki Fujita and Eri Kitamura, while the main ending theme is  performed by Jun Fukuyama, Daisuke Ono and Hiroshi Kamiya. For the third and final season, the opening theme is "Now!!!

Episode listing

Working!! (2010)

Working'!! (2011)

Working!!! (2015)

WWW.Working!! (2016)

References

Working!!